The LTI TXII is a hackney carriage (London hail taxi) manufactured by LTI. It is the second model following the modernisation and re-design of the London taxi that began with the TX1.

The vehicle has a handful of differences from its predecessor including a change of engine from Nissan to the intercooled Ford Duratorq, which, according to the manufacturer increases torque by 21%. The remaining modifications are largely cosmetic or are minor improvements to the design and equipment on the TX1. It was available with a five-speed manual or a four-speed automatic.

It was succeeded by the TX4.

References

Tx2
TX2
TX2
TX2

External links